The Taiji Program in Space, or Taiji, is a proposed Chinese satellite-based gravitational-wave observatory. It is scheduled for launch in 2033 to study ripples in spacetime caused by gravitational waves. The program consists of a triangle of three spacecraft orbiting the sun linked by laser interferometers.  

There are two alternative plans for Taiji. One is to take a 20 percent share of the European Space Agency's LISA project; the other is to launch China's own satellites by 2033 to authenticate the ASE project.  Like LISA, the Taiji spacecraft would be 3 million kilometers apart, making them sensitive to as similar range of frequencies, although Taiji would perform better in some of that range.

Program Goal

'Taiji Program' is the ELISA Program proposed by ESA, and the predecessor of the ELISA Program is the LISA Program cooperated by ESA and NASA. Similar to the configuration of the three networking satellites in the LISA Program, the three satellites in the Taiji Program also rotate around their centroid. The centroid also revolves in orbit around the sun. The difference is that the phases of the LISA system, Earth system and Taiji system are different. With the earth as the reference, the phase of the LISA system is 20 degrees behind that of the Programet, and the phase of the Taiji system is 20 degrees ahead of that of the earth. In addition, the Tai Chi Program is part of the proposed space-based gravitational wave observatories Program, the other parts of which are the Chinese Academy of Sciences (CAS) Tianqin Program and the European Space Agency (ESA) Laser Interferometer Space Antenna (LISA) and the Decimal Hertz Interferometer Gravitational-Wave Observatory (DECIGO) led by the Japan Aerospace Exploration Agency (JAXA). In December 2021, a study pointed out that the gravitational wave detection network combined with Taiji and LISA will accurately measure the Hubble constant greater than 95.5% within ten years. Moreover, The LISA-Taiji network has the potential to detect more than twenty stellar binary black holes (sBBHs), for which the error in luminous distance measurement is in the range of 0.05−0.2, and the relative error in sky positioning is in the range of 1−100deg2 In the range.

The main scientific goal of the Taiji Program is to measure the mass, spin and distribution of black holes through the precise measurement of gravitational waves, to explore how intermediate-mass seed black holes develop if dark matter can produce black seed holes, and how enormous and supermassive black holes grow from black seed holes; Look for traces of the earliest generation of stars' genesis, development, and death, give direct restrictions on the intensity of primordial gravitational waves, and detect the polarization of gravitational waves, providing direct observational data for revealing the nature of gravity. Gravitational waves can provide a clear picture of the universe because they are weakly linked to matter, and the information provided can be used in conjunction with information from telescopes and particle detectors. The precise measurement of gravitational waves allows for in-depth and thorough investigation of the universe's large-scale structure, the birth and development of galaxies, and other topics; Better develop and establish a quantum theory of gravity beyond Einstein's general theory of relativity, reveal the nature of gravity, and help understand dark matter, the nature of energy, the formation of black holes, and cosmic inflation, Gravitational waves can transmit information that electromagnetic waves cannot. At the same time, the forward-looking technology developed from this is of great significance for improving the technical level of space science and deep space exploration; It will also play a positive role in applications such as inertial navigation, earth science, global environmental change, and high-precision satellite platform construction.

Program History

In 2008, the Chinese Academy of Sciences began demonstrating the feasibility of space gravitational wave detection, proposing the "Taiji Program" for China's space gravitational wave detection, and establishing the "single satellite, dual satellite, three satellites" and "three steps" development strategy and road map； and in August 2018, the "Taiji Program" single-satellite program was implemented in the Space Science (Phase II) Strategic Pilot Science and Technology Special Neutral Program and the first step in the three-step process was launched, that is, the Taiji-1 satellite.

On August 31, 2019, Taiji-1 satellite was launched from the Jiuquan Satellite Launch Center. In July 2021, "Taiji-1" has completed all the preset experimental tasks and achieved the highest precision space laser interferometry in China. It has achieved the world's first full performance verification of the two types of micro-push technology of Microbull-level radiofrequency ion and Hall, and took the lead in realizing the breakthrough of two non-drug control technologies in China.

The optical metrology system and the non-resistance control system, both of which are part of Taiji-2 satellites, were confirmed by the Taiji-1 satellite mission; The mission's success also gave sufficient backing for the creation of Taiji-2 satellite; However, because Taiji-1 satellite only has one satellite, there is no way to test the inter-satellite laser link; The relevant unit expects to launch two satellites (Taiji-2) in 2023-2025 to clear obstacles for Taiji-3 satellites. And it is expected to launch an equilateral triangle gravitational wave detection star group composed of three satellites around 2030.

Program Responsibility Unit

The scientific application unit and user of Taiji-1 in this Program is UCAS. The Taiji Program and the ground support system are managed by China's National Space Science Center, while the satellite system is developed by the Chinese Academy of Sciences' Institute of Microsatellite Innovation; the Institute of Precision Measurement Science and Technology Innovation, Chinese Academy of Sciences, Institute of Mechanics, Chinese Academy of Sciences, Shanghai Institute of Optics and Fine Mechanics, Chinese Academy of Sciences, Changchun Institute of Optics and Fine Mechanics, Chinese Academy of Sciences, Singapore University of Science and Technology, Singapore Nanyang Technological University, and the Institute of Precision Measurement Science and Technology Innovation, Chinese Academy of Sciences are among the cooperative units involved in payload development. In addition, the Chinese Academy of Sciences established the gravitational wave cosmic polar laboratory in Hangzhou in April 2021.

References 

 
Astronomical observatories
Gravitational instruments
Interferometric gravitational-wave instruments
Space telescopes
Proposed space probes